Anopliomorpha rinconium is a species of beetle in the family Cerambycidae. It was described by Casey in 1924.

References

Elaphidiini
Beetles described in 1924